Copelatus waltoni is a species of diving beetle. It is part of the subfamily Copelatinae in the family Dytiscidae. It was described by J. Balfour-Browne in 1950.

References 

waltoni
Beetles described in 1950